Maoping is a town under the administration of Jinping County, Guizhou, China. , it has 3 villages under its administration.

References 

Towns of Qiandongnan Miao and Dong Autonomous Prefecture
Jinping County, Guizhou